Sverre Kvammen (6 January 1908 – 4 April 1982) was a Norwegian footballer. He played in one match for the Norway national football team in 1935. He was also part of Norway's squad for the football tournament at the 1936 Summer Olympics, but he did not play in any matches.

References

External links
 

1908 births
1982 deaths
Norwegian footballers
Norway international footballers
Footballers from Bergen
Association football goalkeepers
Viking FK players